Benjamin Dumont Koe (1816 – 30 June 1842) was an English cricketer. Koe's batting style is unknown.

Born in London, Koe undertook his university studies at the University of Cambridge, making a single first-class appearance for the University Cricket Club against Oxford at Lord's in 1838. In a match which Oxford University won by 98 runs, Koe batted twice, being run out in Cambridge University's first-innings for a duck, while in their second-innings he was dismissed for 5 runs by Nicholas Darnell.

He died at Highgate, Middlesex on 30 June 1842.

References

External links
Benjamin Koe at ESPNcricinfo
Benjamin Koe at CricketArchive

Cricketers from Greater London
English cricketers
Cambridge University cricketers
1816 births
1842 deaths
Alumni of Gonville and Caius College, Cambridge